The Internal Enemy: Slavery and War in Virginia, 1772-1832 is a Pulitzer Prize-winning non-fiction book about the history of slaves and slavery in Virginia, with an emphasis on the War of 1812. It was written by historian Alan Taylor and published by W. W. Norton & Company in 2013.

Reception
The Internal Enemy was a finalist for the 2013 National Book Award for Nonfiction and won the 2014 Pulitzer Prize for History.

References

Further reading

External links
Book Discussion on The Internal Enemy (C-SPAN, 24 September 2013)

Pulitzer Prize for History-winning works
2013 non-fiction books
21st-century history books
Slavery in the United States
War of 1812 books
History of slavery in Virginia
W. W. Norton & Company books
Books about Virginia